This is a list of film festivals in Slovakia.

International film festivals 
   Bratislava
  Art Film Fest
  Cinematik

Documentary 
  Etnofilm
  Hory a film
  ekotopfilm
  Envirofilm
  Festival Horských Filmov
  International Festival of Outdoor Films (IFOF)

Student film festivals 
  Early Melons (international)
  Áčko (VSMU)
  Frame (FMK UCM)

Animation festivals 
  Fest Anča (international)
  Bienále animácie

Online film festivals 
  Azyl
  ArtCinema

Film
Film festivals in Slovakia
Slovakia
Slovakia